The Waiting Game is the debut studio album by Irish singer Una Healy. It was released on 10 February 2017, through Decca Records. The album was preceded by the release of one single "Stay My Love". British singer Sam Palladio features as the only collaboration on the album. The Waiting Game has sold 12,000 copies in the UK and Ireland.

Background and release
Following The Saturdays hiatus in 2014, on 18 April 2016, Healy premiered her first solo track, indie-inspired "Staring at the Moon", performing the song live on the semi-final of The Voice of Ireland. On 5 August 2017, Healy revealed she had signed a record deal with Decca Records. On 18 October 2016, Digital Spy reported that Healy's debut album would be released in 2017, under the reported title, The Waiting Game. On 27 October 2016, an audio video for the title track "The Waiting Game" was uploaded to Healy's YouTube account announcing the pre-order of the album. On 25 November 2016, an audio video for "Angel Like You" was released to Healy's YouTube channel.

Singles
"Stay My Love" was released as the album's lead single on 13 January 2017. The music video was released on Healy's YouTube channel on 20 January 2017 directed by Urban Strom. The song charted on the Scottish Singles Chart at number fifty six.

Track listing
Album credits taken from Discogs.

Personnel
Credits adapted from Discogs.

Performers and musicians

Una Healy – vocals
Mark Read – backing vocals
Sara Eker – backing vocals

Technical personnel

Adam Phillips – guitar
Brian Rawling – production
Dick Beetham – mastering
Dom Liu – recording, additional percussion
Harry Rutherford – recording
Ian Thomas – drums, bass
Jeremy Meehan – bass
Joe Corcoran – additional production
Mark Read – piano
Matt Furmidge – mixing, recording, percussion

Charts

Release history

References

2017 debut albums
Decca Records albums